Musikhaus Thomann is a German-based retailer of musical instruments, studio, lighting, and pro-audio equipment. Thomann became widely known primarily due to its large online retail operation, Thomann Cyberstore. According to a 2014 article in the largest Upper Franconian newspaper based in Bavaria, the Fränkischer Tag (de), Musikhaus Thomann is the largest online retailer of its category of merchandise, worldwide. Hans Thomann Sr., founded the company  years ago (in 1954) as a family business in Treppendorf — part of the village of Burgebrach, in Bavaria, Germany — where the Musikhaus Thomann headquarters endures today.

Company 
The company has been managed by Hans Thomann Jr, representative of the second Thomann generation, since 1990. Since 1997, Thomann have been selling products through their own web site. In the first year, online turnover ran to DM 800,000.

Musikhaus Thomann is divided into three business units:
 Musikhaus Thomann – music store, warehouse, and logistics-center
 Thomann Direktversand and Thomann Cyberstore – distribution unit with about 3.1m customers and the thomann.de online platform; and
 Thomann Audio Professionell – installation unit for major projects serving theaters, stadiums and other venues

Between 2004 and 2012, the number of customers has almost tripled and now slightly exceeds 3 million.

In 2004, the company achieved a turnover of EUR 10m. In 2006, the company disclosed a turnover of EUR 129m, making it one of the fifty fastest-growing companies in Bavaria once more.

In September 2010, Musikhaus Thomann received the Versender des Jahres (Mail Order Business of the Year) Award, which the German Association of Mail Order Companies' hands out annually. The panel of judges chose Musikhaus Thomann for its strong growth, commitment to innovation, and high level of customer satisfaction.

In 2011, Musikhaus Thomann was presented with the Global E-Commerce award (Gold) at the Global E-Commerce Summit in Barcelona. Eight national winners competed for the European prize. Thomann was the German nominee, having won the 2010 mail Order Business of the Year Award. The Jury noted that Thomann was "Demonstrating the ability to tap into a market segment that a few years ago nobody believed could be served through internet retail"

Store-brands 

Thomann sells several store brands, including:

 Fun Generation (lightning effects) 
Harley Benton (plucked and string instruments, accessories, guitar and bass amplifiers, effect pedals)

 Startone (wind instruments, brass instruments, accordions, guitars, music stands)
 Lead Foot (foot switches)
 Millenium (drum sets, percussion, stands)
 Roth & Junius (bowed string instruments, grand pianos)
 Stairville (lighting effects)
 "Stairville" is actually a rough English translation of Treppendorf, which literally translates to "Stairs-Village".
 Swissonic (audio recorders, studio amplification, MIDI keyboards)
 the box, the box pro (PA loudspeakers)
 the sssnake, pro snake (cables, leads)
 the t.akustik (damping and absorption material)
 the t.amp (PA amplification)
 the t.mix (powered mixers, accessories)
 the t.meter (studio meters, indicators)
 the t.bone (microphones, headphones)
 As part of the t.bone brand, Thomann distributes a wide range of microphones from the two largest producers in China
 the t.racks (rack equipment, accessories)
 Thomann (various products)
 Thon (flight cases, hard cases, racks)

References

External links 
 Official website
 List compiled by the Bavarian Ministry of Economic Affairs: Bavaria's Best 50 2004 
Hans Thomann Interview NAMM Oral History Library (2005)

Retail companies of Germany
Companies based in Bavaria
German brands
Musical instruments
Online retailers of Germany
1954 establishments in Germany
Musical instrument retailers